Sitou may refer to these places in China:

Sitou, Shandong, in Linqu County, Shandong
Sitou Township, Yangcheng County, Shanxi